Longueville is a suburb on the Lower North Shore of Sydney, New South Wales, 8 kilometres north-west of the Sydney central business district, in the local government area of the Municipality of Lane Cove.

Longueville is a small residential suburb on the peninsula between Tambourine Bay and Woodford Bay, on the banks of the Lane Cove River. Originally a home to manufacturing industries, the suburb had its beginnings as a residential area in the 1870s. Longueville was officially proclaimed a suburb in the 1920s.

Before settlement, Longueville was the home of the Cam-mer-ray-gal people of the Ku-ring-gai Aboriginal Tribe. Today the suburb is home to some of Australia's most expensive real estate, with the Sydney Morning Herald ranking it as Sydney's fourth most-expensive suburb.

History

The area in which Longueville is was originally inhabited by the Cam-mer-ray-gal Group of the Ku-ring-gai Aboriginal Tribe. The group, which inhabited the north shore of Port Jackson, was one of the largest in the Sydney area.

In 1831, the area that is now Longueville became home to one of the earliest manufacturing industries, with Rupert Kirk's soap and factory. Longueville had its beginnings in the 1870s, and at the time encompassed the Lane Cove area, which in turn was then part of Willoughby. By 1884, there were just two houses in the area, owned by Joseph Palmer and Henry Lamb. Richard Hayes Harnett, a land speculator, later acquired some of the land and subdivided it into home sites. He later became the first mayor of Mosman.

Longueville was officially proclaimed a suburb in the 1920s.

There is some conjecture about where the name Longueville originated, however a commonly held belief is that the suburb was named after French nobleman, the Duc de Longueville. The main streets are said to have been named after his three daughters, Christina, Lucretia and Arabella.   A related theory is that the name bears a connection to the Château de Châteaudun which possesses both a Longueville wing and a Dunois wing, with Dunois being the name of one of the principal streets in Longueville.

Transport
Longueville Wharf provides access to ferry services on Lane Cove River Cruises. Three Sydney Buses services run through Longueville, going to the Sydney CBD, Lane Cove and Chatswood.

Houses

In 2011, the majority of dwellings were detached houses (99.1%) with some varied architectural styles, including stately Victorian-style homes, Federation styles, Californian bungalows, weatherboard cottages, and contemporary waterfront houses.

According to the Sydney Morning Herald, Longueville was ranked Sydney’s fourth most expensive suburb in 2014 with a median property price of $2.7 million, having climbed from the fifth most expensive at $2.35 million in 2011, positioning it as one of Sydney's most prestigious suburbs. In the past few years, the suburb has seen many new homes being constructed and older houses undergoing extensive renovations.
Norfolk Road holds the record for the highest sale price achieved at auction in the suburb.

Population

Demographics

In the 2011 Australian Bureau of Statistics Census of Population and Housing, the population of Longueville stood at 2,099 people, 50.1% females and 49.9% males, with a median age of 42 years. 24.3% of the population was born overseas with England (5.2%), New Zealand (2.1%) and the United States of America (1.0%) the most common. The five strongest religious affiliations in the area were in descending order: Catholic (40.8%), Anglican (20.9%), no religion (17.4%), Uniting Church (3.7%) and Eastern Orthodox (2.6%).

Longueville's population is typically indebted, with a median weekly household income of 3,040, compared with A$1,234 in Australia. The most common types of occupation for employed persons were Professionals (44.3%), Managers (22.2%), and Clerical and Administrative Workers (14.4%). 89.5% of the suburbs occupied private dwellings were family households, 10% were lone person households and 0.5% were group households.

Notable residents
Notable former and current residents of Longueville include:
 Marjorie Barnard - novelist
 Pamela Clauss - NYC-based pioneering surgical nurse and philanthropist
 Louisa Dunkley - Union leader and feminist
 Antonia Kidman - journalist, television host
 Nicole Kidman - actress
 Rose Lindsay - artist's model, printmaker, author and wife of Norman Lindsay
 John Newcombe - tennis player
 Patrick O'Farrell - historian  of Catholic Australia
 Brett Whiteley - artist
 Geoffrey Robertson - Barrister

Politics 

Longueville is in the safe Liberal federal electoral division of North Sydney. Former Federal Treasurer Joe Hockey represented the seat from 1996 and was replaced by Trent Zimmerman at the 2015 North Sydney by-election.  Zimmerman was the first openly gay man to be elected to the House of Representatives and was re-elected at the 2016 federal election. North Sydney is one of only two original divisions in New South Wales, along with Wentworth, which have never been held by the Australian Labor Party (ALP).

For NSW state elections, Longueville is in the Electoral district of Lane Cove. Since 2003, this seat has been held by Liberal MP Anthony Roberts, a minister in the state government.

References

External links
 

Suburbs of Sydney
Lane Cove Council